Hsieh Cheng-peng and Rameez Junaid were the defending champions but only Hsieh chose to defend his title, partnering Christopher Rungkat. Hsieh successfully defended his title.

Hsieh and Rungkat won the title after defeating Li Zhe and Gonçalo Oliveira 6–4, 3–6, [10–6] in the final.

Seeds

Draw

References
 Main draw

Pingshan Open - Men's Doubles
2019 Men's Doubles